Camp is a village near the Slieve Mish Mountains in County Kerry, Ireland, on the Dingle Peninsula. It is close to the Dingle Way and is a destination for tourists.

History
The village has been associated with the Milesians legend, thus the first possible recorded history from the area dates to around 1700 BC. Local rail transport used to include the route along the Tralee and Dingle Light Railway.

The local Roman Catholic church, which is dedicated to Saint Mary, was built .

See also 
 List of towns and villages in County Kerry

References 

Towns and villages in County Kerry